The  (plural, or   in singular, literally "Egyptianized") refers to "Egyptianized" foreigners residing in Egypt, primarily during the 19th and 20th centuries.

The Mutamassirun community was first established in Egypt in the early 19th century, following the French campaign in Egypt and Syria and Muhammad Ali's seizure of power. From the early 20th century they became an important component of Egyptian society, and despite their diversity were usually viewed as a homogeneous group by Egyptian nationalists.

The Mutamassirun community consisted of: Greeks, Italians, Jews, Armenians, Syro-Lebanese (Levantine Christians) and Maltese communities.

The populations that carried British or French nationality (e.g. Greeks, Italians, and Jews) were expelled in the 1950s. These expulsions took place in retaliation to the Suez Crisis 

Around 6,000-60,000 Greeks and 3000 Italians remain in Egypt today but changed their nationality to Egyptian, they are descendants of their Mutamassirun ancestors that were living in Egypt.

See also
Pieds-noirs
Arabized

Bibliography

References

Ethnic groups in Egypt
Social history of Egypt
Jewish Egyptian history